Carlos Borchers (born 13 November 1907, date of death unknown) was a Brazilian sailor. He competed in the Swallow event at the 1948 Summer Olympics.

References

External links
 

1907 births
Year of death missing
Brazilian male sailors (sport)
Olympic sailors of Brazil
Sailors at the 1948 Summer Olympics – Swallow
Place of birth missing